Her Love Story is a 1924 American silent romantic drama film directed by Allan Dwan and starring Gloria Swanson. It was produced by Famous Players-Lasky, distributed by Paramount Pictures, and based on the short story "Her Majesty, the Queen" by Mary Roberts Rinehart.

Cast

Preservation
With no prints of Her Love Story located in any film archives, it is a lost film.

See also
List of lost films

References

External links

Lobby poster and stills
Posters (Wayback Machine) (click image even if blank)
Second lobby poster (Wayback Machine) (click image even if blank)

1924 films
American silent feature films
Films directed by Allan Dwan
Lost American films
Films based on short fiction
Paramount Pictures films
1924 romantic drama films
American romantic drama films
Films set in Europe
American black-and-white films
Films based on works by Mary Roberts Rinehart
1920s American films
Silent romantic drama films
Silent American drama films